Étienne Jules Adolphe Desmier de Saint-Simon, Vicomte d'Archiac (24 September 180224 December 1868) was a French geologist and paleontologist.

Early life
He was born at Reims and educated at the Military School of St. Cyr. He served for nine years as a cavalry officer until 1830, when he retired from the service. Prior to this he had published an historical romance (Zizim, ou les Chevaliers de Rhodes, roman historique du XVe siècle); but now geology became his primary focus. In his earlier scientific works, which date from 1835, he described the Tertiary and Cretaceous formations of France, Belgium and England, and dealt especially with the distribution of fossils geographically and in sequence. Later on he investigated the Carboniferous, Devonian and Silurian formations.

Magnum opus
His best work was "Histoire des progrès de la géologie de 1834 à 1859", published in eight volumes (1847–1860). In 1853 the Wollaston Medal of the Geological Society of London was awarded to him. In the same year, with Jules Haime (1824–1856), he published a monograph on the Nummulitic formation of India. In 1857 he was elected a member of the French Academy of Sciences, and in 1861 he was appointed professor of paleontology in the Muséum National d'Histoire Naturelle in Paris. His better known later works include "Paléontologie stratigraphique", in three volumes (1864–1865); "Géologie et paléontologie" (1866); and his paleontological contributions to de Tchihatcheff's "Asie mineure" (1866).

Death
While suffering from severe depression he committed suicide by throwing himself into the River Seine on Christmas Eve, 1868.

Further reading

References

External links
 OCLC Classify List of publications by Adolphe d'Archiac.

French paleontologists
French geologists
1802 births
1868 deaths
Scientists from Reims
Suicides by drowning in France
Wollaston Medal winners
Members of the French Academy of Sciences
1860s suicides